Fort C.F. Smith was a lunette that the Union Army constructed in Alexandria County (now Arlington County), Virginia, during 1863 as part of the Civil War defenses of Washington (see Washington, D.C., in the American Civil War). It was named in honor of General Charles Ferguson Smith, who died from a leg infection that was aggravated by dysentery on April 25, 1862.

The Army built the lunette on a bluff overlooking the Potomac River and Spout Run. Because of its elevation and location, the lunette could protect the Aqueduct Bridge from invaders traveling along each of the two waterways.

History

Civil War
Following the Union Army's defeat at the Second Battle of Bull Run (Manassas) in August 1862, the Army constructed Fort C. F. Smith in 1863. The lunette was located on property that Thomas Jewell had previously owned and that contained a red house.  During construction, the fort was therefore referred to "Fort at Red House". The Army destroyed the house while building the lunette and nearby fortifications.

General John G. Barnard wrote in a report that "Fort C. F. Smith was carefully planned and constructed after our latest models." The lunette had a southern and western face and two flanks, as well as a crémaillère line on the north side to protect it from attack up the ravines from the river.

A May 17, 1864, report from the Union Army's Inspector of Artillery (see Union Army artillery organization) noted the following:

Fort C. F. Smith, Maj. W. A. McKay commanding.–Garrison, four companies Second New York Heavy Artillery–1 major, 15 commissioned officers, 1 ordnance-sergeant, 548 men. Armament, three 12-pounder field howitzers, two  6-pounder field guns, four 24-pounder siege guns, one 8-inch sea-coast howitzer, six 4 ½ -inch ordnance, and four 8-inch siege mortars. Magazines, two; dry and in serviceable condition. Ammunition, full supply and well packed. Implements, complete and serviceable. Drill in artillery, very ordinary; wants improving much. Drill in infantry, insufficient; wants more energy and attention given to it. Discipline, great want of improvement. Garrison is sufficient.

In 1865, the lunette's armaments were: one 8-inch sea-coast howitzer, three 12-pounder howitzers, four 24-pounder siege guns, two  10-pound Parrot rifles, six 4 ½-inch ordinance, three 4-inch siege mortars, and six vacant platforms. Fort C. F. Smith and other Union Army fortifications on and near the Arlington Line saw little or no fighting during the war; the Army's biggest enemies in the area were diseases such as malaria and typhoid fever, as well as handling live ammunition.

Post-War
After the Civil War ended in April 1865, the Army dismantled and abandoned Fort C.F. Smith during the fall of that year. Wooden structures and revetments were removed. The Army destroyed the lunette's magazines and bomb-proof in order to salvage their wooden structural remains. Used lumber, timber, hardware, and tools were sold at public auctions.  

Thomas Jewell's family then succeeded in recovering their property. The Deming and Yates families took ownership of the property from 1888 to 1924. Charles Lindsay owned the property from 1924 to 1926. The Hendry family then owned the property from 1927 to 1993.

Construction of 24th Street North destroyed about one-third of the lunette's remains. However, the development of the property into a private estate provided a measure of protection to the remains of the lunette north of 24th Street.

In 1965, the Arlington County government erected a historical marker near the site of the lunette's remnants. The Arlington County Board designated the lunette to be a local historic district on February 28, 1987.

In 1994 and in succeeding years, the County government acquired the lunette's property, created the  Fort C.F. Smith Park, and preserved the lunette's remnants at a cost of over $11 million. On February 1, 2000, the National Park Service listed the fort on the National Register of Historic Places.

The Virginia Civil War Trails has erected a historic marker near the fort's site. The Arlington County government hosted an event celebrating the opening of a new visitors center in Fort C.F. Smith Park on March 31, 2018.

Existing remnants 

With the exception of those that construction of 24th Street North removed, the earthen remains of the lunette survive largely intact within Arlington County's Fort C.F Smith Park.  Gun platforms 8-11 are clearly visible, as is a well.  The fortification contains bastions that are unusual within lunettes. The ammunition magazine is also still visible, as is the bombproof area.  Soldiers would use the bombproof if they were under siege, as it functioned as a traverse that localized the effects of shell bursts. Parapets, which protected the soldiers from fire, and the gorge, which protected soldiers from flanking fire, also remain visible.

See also
 List of Arlington County Historic Districts

Notes

References

External links
 Historical photographs of Fort C.F. Smith in the collection of the Library of Congress. Retrieved 2018-03-14

Buildings and structures in Arlington County, Virginia
Smith
Smith
National Register of Historic Places in Arlington County, Virginia
Arlington County Historic Districts
Historic districts on the National Register of Historic Places in Virginia
Archaeological sites on the National Register of Historic Places in Virginia
Smith
American Civil War on the National Register of Historic Places